Old South Mebane Historic District is a national historic district located at Mebane, Alamance County, North Carolina. It encompasses 308 contributing buildings in a primarily residential section of Mebane.  The district primarily includes one- to two-story frame residences in a variety of vernacular and popular architectural styles including Colonial Revival, American Craftsman, and Queen Anne styles. The earliest dwellings date to about 1900.

It was added to the National Register of Historic Places in 2011, with a boundary increase in 2013.

References

Historic districts on the National Register of Historic Places in North Carolina
Houses on the National Register of Historic Places in North Carolina
Queen Anne architecture in North Carolina
Colonial Revival architecture in North Carolina
Historic districts in Alamance County, North Carolina
National Register of Historic Places in Alamance County, North Carolina
Houses in Alamance County, North Carolina